Abel Ernesto Herrera (born May 9, 1955) is a former Argentine football left back. He holds the record for the most league appearances for Estudiantes de La Plata in the professional era with 467.

Nicknamed "Titi" Herrera was noted for his short stature and intense play, he played a total of 481 games for the La Plata club in all competitions. He is a one-club man having played his entire professional career for Estudiantes.

Titles

References

1955 births
Living people
Sportspeople from Avellaneda
Argentine footballers
Estudiantes de La Plata footballers
Argentine Primera División players
Association football defenders